Elysius proba is a moth of the family Erebidae. Described by William Schaus in 1892, it is found in Mexico and Honduras.

References

proba
Moths described in 1892
Moths of Central America